John Brereton (1659–1718) was an English baron in the Peerage of Ireland.

He was born on 2 December 1659, the son of the William Brereton, 3rd Baron Brereton, and his wife Frances Willoughby.  He lived at Brereton Hall near Sandbach, Cheshire. He inherited the Barony upon his father's death in 1679 and became a member of the House of Lords, but did not sit in James II's parliament of 7 May 1689.

He married Mary (1655–1715) the youngest daughter of Sir Thomas Tipping of Wheatfield Park in Oxfordshire, but they had no children and he was succeeded by his brother, Francis Brereton, 5th Baron Brereton.

References
 G E Cokayne, The Complete Peerage

1659 births
1718 deaths
Barons Brereton
People from Sandbach
John